Blackhawk was a  comic strip appearing on the British magazine Tornado, created by Gerry Finley-Day. It was one of three strips to transfer from Tornado to 2000 AD after the two merged.

Plot synopsis

At the time of the Roman Empire a Nubian slave rises up against his captors and leads a rebellion. However his bravery is recognised by a Roman General and he is commissioned as a Roman Centurion. Blackhawk took his name from a Hawk that he adopted and assembled a crack platoon from hardened prisoners and other slaves. As with other Finley-Day war stories the basic plot was borrowed from The Dirty Dozen with Blackhawk's squad being singled out for the hardest missions.

In 2000 AD he is taken from his Roman captors by an alien species only to be entered into their own intergalactic gladiatorial events against other alien species. Blackhawk adopts a Wookiee type alien as a sidekick (ironically the Hawk that gave him his name was left behind on earth). Blackhawk manages to escape but ends up stranded on a planet orbiting a black hole.  Here a creature called "The SoulSucker" removes Blackhawks soul and he pursues the SoulSucker relentlessly, eventually regaining it shortly before the end of the series run.

Eventually, Tharg the Mighty's race were written in, as a robotic "Kwark" created by the "Thargians", and the whole cast were sucked into a black hole. They are later seen in Tharg's desk drawer, full of other dead or discarded characters, where Blackhawk complains how long they have been waiting as Ace Garp is selected for a revival.

In the 2000 AD Yearbook 1994 it was acknowledged by the editor that this was a poor series, and Alan Grant had written himself into a corner.

Characters
Blackhawk
Ursa
Batak
Zog

Bibliography

 "Blackhawk" (with Gerry Finley-Day and Azpiri, in Tornado #4-22, 1979)
 "Blackhawk" (with Alan Grant/Kelvin Gosnell as "Alvin Gaunt" and Alan Grant (2-34); Massimo Belardinelli, Ramon Sola (5, 16, 17), Joe Staton (6) and Greg Guler (17), in 2000 AD #127-161, 1979)
 "Blackhawk" (Tornado Annual 1981)
 "Death-Dive" (2000AD Annual 1981)
 "The Longest Walk" (with Alan Grant and Joe Staton, 2000AD Sci-Fi Special 1982)

Collected editions
All the stories are collected in one trade paperback:

Blackhawk (288 pages, November 2011)

Notes

References

Blackhawk at Barney 

Comics characters introduced in 1979